Anthony Jardine (born 5 March 1952 in Liverpool) is an English motorsport pundit, former driver and former Formula One assistant team manager. He is currently contracted to Sky Sports as a presenter and pundit on their coverage of F1 as well as providing studio-based F1 expert analysis for BeIn Sports Qatar.

Motorsport career
Jardine began his career as a teacher, and for a time he was Head of Art at the New English School in Kuwait. His motorsport career started in single seater racing cars. He was competing in a Palliser Formula Ford car in 1973 while living in Birkenhead. Whilst in Kuwait he took up rally driving for the local Datsun importers in his spare time. He was comparatively successful, finishing eighth on the Kuwait International Rally in 1975.

Outside his later Formula One management career, Jardine has continued to race in rallying on an amateur and semi-professional basis, mainly in the UK but also overseas. Jardine has competed in four Arctic Rallies and ten Network Q Rally GBs, finishing second in class in 2001 and winning the journalists' award three times. He also tested a Tyrrell 026 at Donington Park in 1998. Jardine has taken part in Rally GB every year since returning to the UK, and in 2013 competed in a Mitsubishi Lancer with co-driver Amy Williams.

Formula One career
Jardine then moved into Formula One (F1), getting a job working for Goodyear's Grand Prix Team, driving trucks and fitting tyres at races. His next role was with the Brabham F1 team, where he worked with Niki Lauda and designer Gordon Murray. Jardine then left F1 to work for an American promotions company, but within eighteen months he was back in F1 working for Lotus; colleagues here included Nigel Mansell, Elio de Angelis and Ayrton Senna. In 1985 he formed his own sports PR company, Jardine Communications Ltd, in which future ITV co-presenter Louise Goodman worked. In 2012, Jardine International was taken over by the HPS Group, becoming HPS Jardine.

Media career
Jardine started working for the BBC in the 1980s, including standing in for Murray Walker, as main commentator, at the 1985 German Grand Prix. He presented the 1988, 1989 and 1990 official Formula One season review videos produced by the Formula One Constructors Association. After the death of James Hunt in 1993, Jonathan Palmer moved to become co-commentator alongside Walker and Jardine became the BBC's full time pitlane reporter. When the Formula 1 coverage switched to ITV in 1997, he became one of their main pundits, a role he fulfilled until 2005. He has also been a key presenter for ITV's coverage of the Goodwood Festival of Speed from 2006. In 2006 he moved to Sky Sports as a studio expert on GP Masters, A1 GP and the Race of Champions, in 2010 he became a studio contributor for Sky Sports News and talkSPORT. He also provides expert analysis for BeIn Sports' F1 coverage from their Doha studios.

Personal life
He also does a considerable amount of after-dinner speaking for clients including Toyota, Heineken and Toshiba. In 2007, Jardine's wife Jeanette was badly injured in a car crash, in which she was an innocent bystander. She had to have her right arm amputated. The couple have been married since 1978.

References

External links
Injured wife
ESPN Profile

1952 births
British sports journalists
Formula One journalists and reporters
Living people
Motorsport announcers
McLaren people
British rally drivers